Balia was a Lok Sabha constituency in Bihar.

Assembly segments
Balia (Lok Sabha constituency) was composed of the following assembly segments in 2004:
Balia
Barauni
Bachwara
Cheria Bariarpur
Bakhri
Alauli

Members of Parliament

References

See also
 List of Constituencies of the Lok Sabha

Former Lok Sabha constituencies of Bihar
Former constituencies of the Lok Sabha
2008 disestablishments in India
Constituencies disestablished in 2008